V19 may refer to :
 Brazilian corvette Caboclo (V19), an Imperial Marinheiro class corvette of the Brazilian Navy
 Family history of other conditions, in the Icd9 v codes detail
 a serial name for a 1987 Ariane 3 launch that put the two Aussat-A3 and Eutelsat 1F4 into orbit

V-19 may refer to :
 V-19 Torrent starfighter, a vessel in the Clone Wars animated series